Combination product may refer to :

 Combination drug, two or more drugs formulated together
 combination product (medical), The US FDA term for a medical device and the drug or biologic it is intended to deliver
 Combination Product Sets of music theory